Jub Kabud-e Sofla (also Romanized as Jūb Kabūd-e Soflá and Joob Kaboodé Sofla; also known as Jow Kabūd-e Pā’īn and Jūb Kabūd-e Pā‘īn) is a village in Satar Rural District, Kolyai District, Sonqor County, Kermanshah Province, Iran. At the 2006 census, its population was 255, in 66 families.

References 

Populated places in Sonqor County